Kincaid House may refer to:

in the United States (by state then city)
Gray-Kincaid House, Crosby, Arkansas, listed on the National Register of Historic Places (NRHP)
Hunt House (Griffin, Georgia), also known as the Chapman-Kincaid-Hunt House, NRHP-listed in Spalding County
Decker-Kincaid Homestead, Boonton, New Jersey, listed on the National Register of Historic Places in Morris County, New Jersey
Kincaid-Anderson House, Jenkinsville, South Carolina, NRHP-listed
Kincaid-Howard House, Fincastle, Tennessee, NRHP-listed
Kincaid House (Speedwell, Tennessee), listed on the National Register of Historic Places in Claiborne County, Tennessee
Kincaid-Ausmus House, Speedwell, Tennessee, listed on the National Register of Historic Places in Claiborne County, Tennessee

in Scotland
Kincaid House, historic seat of the Clan Kincaid, today a hotel in Milton of Campsie